Alimov (masculine) or Alimova (feminine) is a Russian surname. Notable people with the surname include:

Artyom Alimov (born 1986), Russian footballer
Denis Alimov (born 1979), Russian luger
Dmitry Alimov (born 1974), Russian businessman
Ennan Alimov (1912–1941), Crimean Tatar writer and artist
Gulnora Alimova (born 1971), Uzbekistani pianist
Ilyaz Alimov (born 1990), Kyrgyzstani footballer
Rodion Alimov (born 1998), Russian badminton player
Ulugbek Alimov (born 1989), Uzbekistani weightlifter
Usman Alimov (born 1950), Grand Mufti of Uzbekistan

See also
58097 Alimov, a main-belt asteroid

Russian-language surnames